(+)-Caryolan-1-ol synthase (GcoA) is an enzyme with systematic name (+)-β-caryophyllene hydrolase (cyclizing, (+)-caryolan-1-ol-forming). This enzyme catalyses the following chemical reaction

 (+)-β-caryophyllene + H2O  (+)-caryolan-1-ol

This enzyme also forms (+)-β-caryophyllene from farnesyl diphosphate.

References

External links 
 

EC 4.2.1